Pasami Saulo (born 1 August 1998) is a professional rugby league footballer who plays as a  for the Canberra Raiders in the NRL.

He previously played for the Newcastle Knights in the National Rugby League.

Background
Saulo was born in Belmont, New South Wales, Australia.

He played his junior rugby league for Fairfield United and the Maitland Pickers, before being signed by the Newcastle Knights. He is of Samoan and Māori descent.

Playing career

Early years
In July 2016, Saulo played for the Australian Schoolboys. From 2016 to 2017, he played for the Newcastle Knights' National Youth Competition team. In November 2017, he re-signed with the Knights on a 2-year contract until the end of 2020.

2018
In 2018, Saulo played some games for Newcastle in the new Jersey Flegg Cup competition, but mostly appeared in their Intrust Super Premiership NSW side. In round 22 of the 2018 NRL season, Saulo became the 300th player to play NRL for the Newcastle club, after making his debut against the New Zealand Warriors, playing off the interchange bench.

2019
Saulo played three games for Newcastle in the 2019 NRL season as the club finished 11th on the table.

2020
Saulo played seven games for Newcastle in the 2020 NRL season as the club qualified for the finals. Saulo did not play in Newcastle's finals campaign which ended in the first week after they were eliminated by South Sydney.

2021
Saulo was limited to only three appearances for Newcastle in the 2021 NRL season. He did not play in Newcastle's elimination final loss to Parramatta.

References

External links

Newcastle Knights profile

1998 births
Living people
Australian rugby league players
Australian sportspeople of Samoan descent
Australian people of Māori descent
Newcastle Knights players
Canberra Raiders players
Maitland Pickers players
Rugby league props
Rugby league players from Newcastle, New South Wales